The cue sports of snooker, English billiards, and three-cushion carom for men, as well as eight-ball and nine-ball pool for both men and women, were contested at the 2006 Asian Games in Doha, Qatar from December 4 to December 11. All events were held at the Al-Sadd Multi-Purpose Hall.

Schedule

Medalists

Men

Women

Medal table

Participating nations
A total of 196 athletes from 28 nations competed in cue sports at the 2006 Asian Games:

References

Results

External links
 Doha 2006

 
2006
2006 Asian Games events
Asian Games
2006 in snooker
Cue sports in Qatar